Mr. Microchip is a live-action children's television series that focused on the world of computer technology and the (then) relatively new home computer trend of the early 1980s. Several 8-bit home computers of the era were seen in the show, including the Apple II, Commodore, Atari and Tandy series. It was originally broadcast in Canada on the CBC, between 1983 and 1985, and later shown in the U.K., Australia and South Africa.

Production
The show was produced by Canada's own animation company, Nelvana, whom at the time had also produced some of its first television series: Inspector Gadget, 20 Minute Workout and The Edison Twins. A total of thirteen episodes were produced. The original scripts were later re-used to produce the same thirteen episodes in French, using different actors, as a show titled M. Micropuce. All twenty-six episodes were produced during the summer of 1982 through the fall of 1984.

The series was created by Skip Lumley and Michael Hirsh, Nelvana and Ventura Pictures, produced by Michael Hirsh and directed by Peter Jennings. Most of the computer hardware, software and electronics in the show were donated by various companies, looking to promote their products at the time.

To date, the show has not been released on home video or DVD.

Synopsis
Aimed at school students aged nine to fifteen, and designed to teach children basic knowledge about computers. It featured Skip Lumley, an adult computer consultant, and his two neighbours, twelve-year-old Stevie Grosfield and his ten-year-old sister Dayna Simon. Visiting Skip's workshop, Stevie and Dayna learned about computers through hands-on demonstrations and clear, analogy-filled explanations. The trio were accompanied by an artificial intelligence fantasy computer named Lumley and a robot called Hero.

Episodes (1982-84)

Episode  1 - "Information please"
Episode  2 - "Bits of programming"
Episode  3 - "Memory is made of this"
Episode  4 - "The computer has a code"
Episode  5 - "Problems, problems, problems"
Episode  6 - "You can count on computers"
Episode  7 - "Flights of fancy"
Episode  8 - "A pixel is worth a thousand words"
Episode  9 - "Music on key"
Episode 10 - "Does that compute?"
Episode 11 - "Games computers play"
Episode 12 - "Ask the teacher"
Episode 13 - "Computers don't do windows"

See also
The Edison Twins, Nelvana's first live-action series.
Bill Nye the Science Guy
Beakman's World
The Screen Savers

References

1980s Canadian children's television series
Television series by Nelvana
1983 Canadian television series debuts
1983 Canadian television series endings